The 1986 New Hampshire Wildcats football team was an American football team that represented the University of New Hampshire as a member of the Yankee Conference during the 1986 NCAA Division I-AA football season. In its 15th year under head coach Bill Bowes, the team compiled a 7–4 record (4–3 against conference opponents) and finished fourth out of eight teams in the Yankee Conference.

Schedule

References

New Hampshire
New Hampshire Wildcats football seasons
New Hampshire Wildcats football